Suvodskaya is a rural locality (a stanitsa) and the administrative center of Suvodskoye Rural Settlement, Dubovsky District, Volgograd Oblast, Russia. The population was 450 as of 2010. There are 11 streets.

Geography 
Suvodskaya is located on the right bank of Volga, 63 km northeast of Dubovka (the district's administrative centre) by road. Rasstrigin is the nearest rural locality.

References 

Rural localities in Dubovsky District, Volgograd Oblast